Songying is a township-level division of Yuhua District, Shijiazhuang, Hebei, China.

Geographical location 
Songying is in the southeast of Shijiazhuang urban. To the east are Yudong Subdistrict, Yuqiang Subdistrict and Fangcun Town of Yuhua District. Bordered by Fangcun Town and Qiema Town to the south.

See also
List of township-level divisions of Hebei

References

Township-level divisions of Hebei